This is a summary of 1974 in music in the United Kingdom, including the official charts from that year.

Events
6 April - The 19th Eurovision Song Contest is staged at The Dome in Brighton. The winning Swedish group ABBA, go on to be the top-selling act of the decade.
7 May - Led Zeppelin announce their new record label, Swan Song Records, with a lavish party at The Four Seasons Hotel in New York.
19 June – Alan Bush's 1950 opera Wat Tyler receives its UK première at Sadler's Wells Theatre, the only time one of Bush's operas has been staged in the UK.
20 July – The first Knebworth Concert is held, headlined by The Allman Brothers Band.
2 November – George Harrison launches his "George Harrison & Friends North American Tour" in Vancouver. It's Harrison's first tour since the Beatles North American Tour of 1966.
28 November – John Lennon joins Elton John on stage at Madison Square Garden for three songs. It would be Lennon's last stage performance.
12 December - Mick Taylor leaves The Rolling Stones  after 6 years.

Number Ones

Singles

Albums

Year-end charts
Between 2 January and 6 December 1974.

Best-selling singles

Best-selling albums
The list of the top fifty best-selling albums of 1974 were published in Music Week and in Record Mirror at the end of the year, and later reproduced in the first edition of the BPI Year Book in 1976. However, in 2007 the Official Charts Company published album chart histories for each year from 1956 to 1977, researched by historian Sharon Mawer, and included an updated list of the top ten best-selling albums for each year based on the new research. The updated top ten for 1974 is shown in the table below.

Notes:

Classical music: new works
Benjamin Britten - Suite on English Folk Tunes: 'A time there was...'

Film and Incidental music
Richard Rodney Bennett - Murder on the Orient Express, starring Albert Finney.
Herbert Chappell - The Pallisers
Andrew Lloyd Webber - The Odessa File.
Stanley Myers - House of Whipcord directed by Pete Walker.

Births
12 January – Melanie C, singer (Spice Girls)
7 February – Danny Goffey, singer-songwriter and drummer (Supergrass, Babyshambles, The Jennifers, Lodger, and The Hotrats)
13 February – Robbie Williams, singer (Take That)
22 February 
James Blunt, singer-songwriter
Chris Moyles, radio and television host
15 March - David Ross, singer (Bad Boys Inc)
17 April - Victoria Beckham, singer (Spice Girls)
20 April – Tina Cousins, singer
3 May - Nick Keynes, bassist (Ultra)
7 May - Lynden David Hall, singer, songwriter, arranger, and record producer (died 2006)
3 June - Kelly Jones, singer-songwriter and guitarist
17 July - Laura Macdonald, Scottish saxophonist and composer
21 July – Terry Coldwell, singer (East 17)
5 August - Spike Dawbarn, singer (911)
8 August - Brian Harvey, singer (East 17)
18 August - Mark Baron, singer (Another Level)
9 September - Niall O'Neill, Irish singer (OTT)
1 October - Keith Duffy, Irish singer (Boyzone)
4 November – Louise Nurding, singer and former member of Eternal
10 November - Heavenli Denton, singer (Honeyz)
23 November - Jacqui Blake, singer (Shampoo)
7 December – Nicole Appleton, Canadian-born singer (All Saints)
27 December - Tasha Baylis, drummer (Hepburn)

Deaths
1 April - Alfred Whitehead,  English-born Canadian composer, organist, choirmaster, music educator and painter, 86
5 April - Jennifer Vyvyan, operatic soprano, 49 (bronchial condition)
28 April - Leslie Statham, composer and arranger, 
5 May - Adge Cutler, folk musician, 42 (car accident) 
8 May – Graham Bond, R&B musician, 36 (hit by train)
15 September - Thomas Fielden, pianist and teacher, 90
November - Bessie Jones, musical theatre singer, 87
3 November - Victor Olof, violinist and conductor, 76
25 November – Nick Drake, singer/songwriter, 26 (overdose)

See also 
 1974 in British radio
 1974 in British television
 1974 in the United Kingdom
 List of British films of 1974

References 

 
British
British music by year